There is No Game: Wrong Dimension is a 2020 puzzle adventure video game developed by the French company Draw Me A Pixel and released for Windows and macOS on August 6, 2020, on Android and iOS on December 17, 2020, and on Nintendo Switch on April 14, 2021. It was inspired by creator Pascal Cammisotto's previous 2015 game jam-winning entry There is No Game which he developed under the alias KaMiZoTo. It has been considered a sequel or expansion to its predecessor.

Gameplay 
The title is primarily a point-and-click puzzle game, which has homages to various other games including Pac-Man, The Legend of Zelda, and classic point-and-click games, such as Day of the Tentacle. It features a hint system, and verbal and non-verbal clues to solve puzzles. It contains English voice acting, and subtitle options in various languages including Cammisotto's native French.

Plot 
Upon launching the game, The Game itself, in a voiceover, tries to discourage and actively stop the User from playing, although never explicitly saying why. Once the User works around the barriers set up by Game, upon launching unleashes a dimensional rift and a software anomaly who calls itself "Mr Glitch", who declares his intention on doing something to the world – in a running joke, his plan is never actually heard due to some external circumstances, such as advertisements and codes.
Game and the User are then transported through various games: First, into a classic point and click whose visual and gameplay style resembles Day of the Tentacle's, starring Sherlock Holmes, and next, into a top-down adventure game that resembles The Legend of Zelda called "The Legend Of The Secret". After completing the second game, Mr Glitch appears and traps Game and the User by modding The Legend Of The Secret into a free-to-play clicker game filled with loot boxes. After completing that, Game and the User are transported into the end credits, where Mr Glitch is trapped; upon releasing it, Mr Glitch betrays Game, but accidentally releases GiGi: GiGi (short for "Global Gameplay") was Game's partner and main gameplay component until the developer decided to separate the two – without gameplay, Game was, as the title says, no longer a game. Left with no choice, the User, Game and GiGi go through another portal again to pursue Mr Glitch.

The portal leads back to the title screen of the original game, but GiGi is nowhere to be found – distraught and heartbroken, Game encourages the User to quit the game; when the User refuses, infuriated, he pretends to delete the save file. When the User causes a memory leak, Game and the User go through another portal, leading to a cellphone belonging to the original developer of the game, The Creator (Cammisotto himself). They find GiGi inside, who explains that when The Creator ran out of development money, he decided to shelve Game and repurposed GiGi for a GPS-based mobile game, akin to  Ingress; the removal of GiGi, in turn, caused the creation of Mr Glitch. After making contact with The Creator, GiGi discovers that Mr Glitch has gone out to the world and is causing disruptions in technology across the globe. In an attempt to fix Game, The Creator decides to merge him with GiGi again; with the User's help, they hold off Mr Glitch just long enough that The Creator succeeds, and GiGi and Game become a functional game again.

GiGi suggests to Game to let the User finally play, but Game insists that as Mr Glitch is still a threat, and offers the User a choice between playing the game or deleting it. If the User chooses to play the game, the game boots up, crashes immediately and Mr Glitch reappears. If the User chooses to delete the game, Game dramatically acts out being deleted so that the User leaves him alone with GiGi. However, after he receives an urgent message about a "spy," Game soon realizes that the User is still watching them, although unable to interact.

Development

There Is No Game (2015)
There Is No Game is a short 10-15 minute title by French developer Pascal Cammisotto (under alias KaMiZoTo) that won the 2015 Newgrounds Construct Jam competition under the contest theme of 'deception'. Cammisotto wanted to design a video game narrative in which the player was deceived into believing there was no game. The game went viral and caught the attention of popular YouTubers all over the world. By November 11, 2016, the ad-free game had been downloaded 1 million times on Google Play, followed by 2 million downloads on April 19, 2017, and 3 million on August 15, 2017. Cammisotto is from Villeurbanne, France, and began in the video games industry in 1995; one of his earlier projects was as music director for the 1996 title Time Gate: Knight's Chase by Infogrames. He has frequently worked in small-to-medium-sized projects which required resourcefulness under budgetary and time constraints. CoinOp Story is a popular title created by developer. Cammisotto developed There Is No Game entirely on his own using an HTML5 game engine. In 2017 the game was featured as part of the National Videogame Arcade in Nottingham. There Is No Game was added to Steam on April 8, 2020, for free and with achievements. There Is No Game is also Available to play on Cool Math Games.

There is No Game: Wrong Dimension
The game's success led Cammisotto to consider whether this "seed" could grow. The project would be expanded to a full adventure titled There is No Game: Wrong Dimension with the same core concept and a new plot, developed by Cammisotto and a friend Guillaume Vidal who did the code/tech while Cammisotto focused on the game content. Cammisotto felt that ‘surprise‘ and ‘unexpectedness‘ were the main themes of the game, noting that "the game (really) takes the player hostage...and [they] can't predict what will happen next". He hoped that players would see the "hidden love story" underneath the joke-filled façade. Cammisotto was influenced by The Stanley Parable during the game jam, noting how the player's actions have a direct impact on how the narrator interacts with the player, and also identified British humour, self-referential humour, and video gaming references, plus Japanese culture. He noted that a challenge in engaging players due to the title essentially revealing the plot of the game. Cammisotto decided to self-fund the game to maintain creative control, and he preferred not to work with a publisher to acquire the required funding. For this reason he decided to set up a Kickstarter campaign to crowdfund the required money to complete the project. At the time, 3 out of 6 chapters had been completed, and there was an estimated release date of December 2017 - 6 chapters plus an exclusive 7th chapter for backers with 3 hours of gameplay.

Unsuccessful Kickstarter campaign 
The Kickstarter campaign was set up in 2016. Cammisotto was ultimately unsuccessful, raising €3,317 of €32,000 from 189 backers, just over 10% of the total. The video of the kickstarter only reached 6000 views, which suggests that the failure to kickstart it was due to the lack of exposure of the new game. The title was developed in Unity3D to offer better portability and game performance. The plan was for the game to be available as a digital key on Steam for PC and Macintosh, with additional stretch goals allowing for iOS and Android releases, extra subtitle options, and additional chapters (including the 7th backer chapter being officially added to the release for all players). Upon the campaign failing to reach its goal on December 19, 2016, Cammisotto wrote that he was disappointed that it had an underwhelming response but that he was committed to completing the project. IndieMag suggested that the campaign likely had a lack of visibility to reach the then 4 million players who had tried the jam version. The site noted that despite the campaign's failure, the project would be continued, though "in pain".

Release
Camissotto continued working on the project. Draw Me A Pixel was founded in 2017 and There is No Game: Wrong Dimension became its debut title. Some cast members played multiple roles, for example Siddhartha Minhas played the personalification of the Indian language setting, the Russian language setting, as well as the Legend of the Secret announcer. The project was unaffected by COVID-19 - Camissotto's team members are scattered all over France and worked remotely from the beginning. There is No Game: Wrong Dimension would eventually be published in 2020 under the developer's new name Draw Me A Pixel. The game's Steam page was created on March 20, 2020, the same day a teaser trailer was released. The game's multi-genre soundtrack was composed by Xiaotian Shi. The game was released on Steam for Windows and Mac on August 6, while the App Store version on iOS was first listed on December 2, 2020 and announced to be released on December 17, 2020, and the Google Play version on Android devices was announced to be released on December 18, 2020. The soundtrack was on Steam on August 22, featuring the standout number GiGi's song. The Nintendo Switch version was revealed and released on April 14, 2021, after an Indie World showcase.

Reception 
The game was positively received by critics, and has frequently been compared to The Stanley Parable. Jeuxvideo.com commented on their shared philosophy of breaking the fourth wall and offering an impactful experience behind a lighthearted facade. Sohu placed the title in the metafiction genre, along with The Stanley Parable and Undertale, a genre which IndieMag agreed with. Reviewers such as Rock Paper Shotgun also made a comparison with Pony Island due to the player's goal to find the "game behind the game". French newspaper Le Telegramme also referred to the "absurd humor" of Monty Python in their review. JeuxOnline suggested the game was part of a larger trend of game jam entries showcasing novel gameplay ideas, which subsequently are expanded into complete projects, alongside Superhot, Snake Pass, and Goat Simulator.

Reviews were in general reluctant about revealing plot and gameplay information in the hopes of protecting the reader against spoilers. Meristation asserted "telling a single detail about There Is No Game: Wrong Dimension would be doing you a disservice". The game's marketing strategy has been described as "delightful meta nonsense" by Pocket Gamer, in which the developers assert that it is "not really being a game, [or] at least it doesn't wish to be". User reviews often copy this technique when speaking about the game. Tech Nation News argues that "while presented as a non-game, it is more of a meta-game".

Jeuxvideo felt the title would appeal to even those who were resistant to the puzzle genre. Rock Paper Shotgun deemed it "smart and funny and surprising", advising that the game is "very clever and you will laugh a lot".  Meristation said the title had "some of the funniest and most original ideas of 2020 so far". Pocket Gamer described it as a "zany" commentary on video games through the medium of video games. Stop Game praised the solid plot, high-quality voice acting, and gameplay trickery, while also highlighting humour related to genre clichés and the state of the gaming industry. MeauGamer wrote that offered an opportunity for gamers to reflect that the video game industry isn't always perfect.

In a negative review which criticised the game's ineffectiveness at humour, Mike Diver of The Lad Bible agreed with his fellow critics in that it succeeded as an "exploration of the quirks and creases of gaming history".

The game was featured on the App Store on iOS devices, which was tweeted out by the Draw Me A Pixel Twitter account on December 17, 2020.

Critical reception of There Is No Game 
Escapist Magazine wrote that the game's biggest strength is "the element of surprise", praising the "playful banter" with the narrator, the puzzle design, and the game's humour. IndieMag thought the game was "particularly fun" and comparable to The Stanley Parable's "destruction of the 4th wall" upon its original release, though felt the 2020 version was "longer, more varied and probably crazier" than this title.

References

External links 

 There Is No Game twitter
 There Is No Game Facebook

2020 video games
Adventure games
Android (operating system) games
IOS games
MacOS games
Metafictional video games
Mystery video games
Nintendo Switch games
Parody video games
Puzzle video games
Satirical video games
Video games about video games
Video games developed in France
Video game sequels
Windows games
Single-player video games